Allium macrostylum is a Central Asian species of wild onion native to  the Tien Shan Mountains in Kyrgyzstan. It is a bulb-forming perennial herb up to 30 cm tall. Leaves are flat, up to 15 mm wide. Umbel is spherical, with lilac-colored flowers.

References

macrostylum
Onions
Flora of Kyrgyzstan
Plants described in 1879